Hoplocentra is a genus of moths belonging to the family Tineidae. It contains only one species, Hoplocentra mucronata, which is found in Uganda.

References

Endemic fauna of Uganda
Myrmecozelinae
Monotypic moth genera
Lepidoptera of Uganda
Moths of Africa